Cerithiopsis morelosensis is a species of sea snail, a gastropod in the family Cerithiopsidae. It was described by Rolán and Fernández-Garcés, in 2010.

Distribution
This marine species occurs off Yucatan, Mexico.

References

 Rolán E. & Fernández-Garcés R. (2010) Four new Cerithiopsis from the Caribbean (Gastropoda, Cerithiopsidae). Basteria 74(4-6): 73-77.
page(s): 73

morelosensis
Gastropods described in 2010